This page is an index of accounting topics.

A
Accounting ethics - Accounting information system - Accounting research - Activity-Based Costing - Assets

B
Balance sheet
- Big Four auditors
- Bond
- Bookkeeping
- Book value

C
Cash-basis accounting
- Cash-basis versus accrual-basis accounting
- Cash flow statement
- Certified General Accountant
- Certified Management Accountants
- Certified Public Accountant
- Chartered accountant
- Chart of accounts
- Common stock
- Comprehensive income
- Construction accounting
- Convention of conservatism
- Convention of disclosure
- Cost accounting
- Cost of capital
- Cost of goods sold
- Creative accounting
- Credit
- Credit note
- Current asset
- Current liability

D
Debitcapital reserve
- Debit note
- Debt
- Deficit (disambiguation)
- Depreciation
- Diluted earnings per share
- Dividend
- Double-entry bookkeeping system
- Dual aspect

E
E-accounting
- EBIT
- EBITDA
- Earnings per share
- Engagement Letter
- Entity concept
- Environmental accounting
- Expense
- Equity
- Equivalent Annual Cost

F
Financial Accounting Standards Board
- Financial accountancy
- Financial audit
- Financial reports
- Financial statements
- Fixed assets
- Fixed assets management
- Forensic accounting
- Fraud deterrence
- Free cash flow
- Fund accounting

G
Gain
- General ledger
- Generally Accepted Accounting Principles
- Going concern
- Goodwill
- Governmental Accounting Standards Board

H
Historical cost - History of accounting

I
Income
- Income statement
- Institute of Chartered Accountants in England and Wales
- Institute of Chartered Accountants of Scotland
- Institute of Management Accountants
- Intangible asset
- Interest
- Internal audit
- International Accounting Standards Board
- International Accounting Standards Committee
- International Accounting Standards
- International Federation of Accountants
- International Financial Reporting Standards
- Inventory
- Investment
- Invoices
- Indian Accounting Standards

J
Job costing
- Journal

L
Lean accounting
- Ledger
- Liability
- Long-term asset
- Long-term liabilities
- Loss on sale of residential property

M
Maker-checker
- Management accounting
- Management Assertions
- Mark-to-market accounting
- Matching principle
- Materiality
- Money measurement concept
- Mortgage loan

N
Negative assurance
- Net income
- Notes to the Financial Statements

O
OBERAC
- One-for-one checking
- Online Accounting
- Operating expense
- Ownership equity

P
Payroll
- Petty cash
- Philosophy of Accounting
- Preferred stock
- P/E ratio
- Positive accounting
- Positive assurance
- PricewaterhouseCoopers
- Profit and loss account
- Pro-forma amount
- Production accounting
- Project accounting

R
Retained earnings
- Revenue
- Revenue recognition

S
Security
- Sales journal
- Social accounting
- Spreadsheet
- Statement of changes in equity
- Statutory accounting principles
- Stock option
- Stock split
- Stock
- Shareholder
- Shareholders' equity
- South African Institute of Chartered Accountants
- Sunk cost

T
Three lines of defence
- Throughput accounting
- Trade credit
- Treasury stock
- Trial balance

U
UK generally accepted accounting principles
- Unified Ledger Accounting
- U.S. Securities and Exchange Commission
- US generally accepted accounting principles
- Work sheet
- Write off

See also
 Outline of accounting
 Outline of marketing
 Outline of economics
 Outline of production
 Outline of business
 Index of auditing-related articles

Accounting topics
Accounting
Accounting